Archibald FitzRoy George Hay, 13th Earl of Kinnoull (20 June 1855 – 7 February 1916), styled Viscount Dupplin from 1886 until 1897, was a Scottish peer and soldier. His titles were Earl of Kinnoull, Viscount Dupplin and Lord Hay of Kinfauns in the Peerage of Scotland; and Baron Hay of Pedwardine in the Peerage of Great Britain.

Biography

Hay was the third son of George Hay-Drummond, 12th Earl of Kinnoull and Lady Emily Somerset, daughter of Henry Somerset, 7th Duke of Beaufort. One of his sisters, Muriel, was married to Count Alexander Münster, son of Georg Herbert zu Münster, German ambassador to the United Kingdom (1873–1885).

He was commissioned into the Royal Perthshire Militia in 1872 and later joined the Black Watch, with whom he fought in the 1882 Anglo-Egyptian War. He was awarded the Ottoman Order of Osmanieh. He served in Egypt as chief of staff to Baker Pasha; he also acted as colonel of the Egyptian Gendarmerie. He retired from the army in 1886, and succeeded to the title on the death of the 12th earl in 1897, his older brothers having died.

The Times noted that the musical earl was "of considerable talent—singing, playing, and composing—and on the occasion of his second marriage composed a hymn to be sung as the bride entered the church."

In the 1890s, he became involved with the Legitimist Jacobite League of Great Britain and Ireland, a part of the Neo-Jacobite Revival, along with Herbert Vivian and others. Vivian left the Jacobite League in August 1893,

He was also a collector; his china and furniture from Dupplin Castle fetched "good prices" when sold at auction at Christie's in May 1911. Later that year his library netted more than £2,700.

Marriage and issue

He married Josephine Maria Hawke in 1877 and they had a son Edmund Alfred Rollo George (b. 1879), the couple separated in 1885. In 1903, he subsequently married Florence Mary Darell, granddaughter of Sir William Lionel Darell, 4th Baronet, and their daughter Lady Elizabeth Blanche Mary Gordon was born the same year. They also had a second daughter.

His son, Edmund, Viscount Dupplin, died of scarlet fever in 1903. On the earl's death in 1916, the earldom passed to his grandson, George.

Ancestors

References

1855 births
1916 deaths
British Militia officers
Black Watch officers
British Army personnel of the Anglo-Egyptian War
13
Neo-Jacobite Revival